Coppet Castle (French: Château de Coppet) is a château in the municipality of Coppet of the Canton of Vaud in Switzerland. It is a Swiss heritage site of national significance. It gave its name to the celebrated group of several dozen early 19th-century intellectuals from the whole of Europe, the so-called Coppet group, who met there ( - 1816) under the aegis of Madame de Staël and made signal contributions to literature, philosophy and politics.

People born in Coppet Castle 
 Alexander zu Dohna-Schlobitten (1661-1728), Prussian field marshal
 Christopher I, Burgrave and Count of Dohna-Schlodien (1665-1733), Prussian general and diplomat

See also
 List of castles in Switzerland
 Château
 Coppet group

References

External links
 Official site

Cultural property of national significance in the canton of Vaud
Castles in Vaud